Petty house is regional British English for an outhouse.

It may also refer to:

in the United States
(by state then city)
Petty-Roberts-Beatty House, historic octagon house in Clayton, Alabama, listed on the National Register of Historic Places (NRHP)
Perry-Petty Farmstead, Mansfield Township, New Jersey, listed on the NRHP in Warren County
Buckingham-Petty House, Duncan Falls, Ohio, listed on the NRHP in Muskingum County
Petty House (Hot Springs, South Dakota), listed on the NRHP in Fall River County
Crawford-Pettyjohn House, Pierre, South Dakota, listed on the NRHP in Hughes County